John Edward Roskos (born November 19, 1974) is a former Major League Baseball player who played for three seasons. He played for the Florida Marlins from 1998 to 1999 and the San Diego Padres in 2000. Over his major league career, he played six games as an outfielder, three as a first baseman, and one as a catcher. Over his professional career, he played 266 games as a first baseman, 206 as a catcher, and 151 as an outfielder. Currently he is employed by the Rio Rancho Police Department in New Mexico as a Police officer.

External links

1974 births
Living people
Baseball players from California
Florida Marlins players
San Diego Padres players
Major League Baseball catchers
Major League Baseball outfielders
Major League Baseball first basemen
People from Victorville, California
American expatriate baseball players in Canada
Calgary Cannons players
Charlotte Knights players
Elmira Pioneers players
Gulf Coast Marlins players
Iowa Cubs players
Kane County Cougars players
Las Vegas Stars (baseball) players
Portland Beavers players
Portland Sea Dogs players